Assiros (before 1926: Γιουβέσνα - Giouvesna) is a village and a former municipality in the Thessaloniki regional unit, Greece. Since the 2011 local government reform it is part of the municipality Lagkadas, of which it is a municipal unit. The 2011 census recorded 1,975 inhabitants in the village of Assiros, 2,216 inhabitants in the  community and 3,861 inhabitants in the municipal unit. The community of Assiros covers an area of 55.369 km2, while the respective municipal unit covers an area of 76.657 km2.

Administrative division
The community of Assiros consists of two separate settlements: 
Assiros (population 1,975)
Examili (population 241)
The aforementioned populations are as of 2011.

History
The archaeological site of Assiros Toumba, a 4000 year old settlement mound, is located within the territory of modern Assiros. Excavation between 1975 and 1989 at this site has made a major contribution to understanding the nature of settlement, society, economy and material culture in prehistoric Macedonia. In addition, a combination of radiocarbon and dendrochronological research on building timbers and radiocarbon dates for animal bones recovered from the site has provided one of the few accurate dates for the transition from Bronze to Iron Age in the Aegean area c.1070 BC, see Dating the End of the Greek Bronze Age: A Robust Radiocarbon-Based Chronology from Assiros Toumba 

According to the statistics of Vasil Kanchov ("Macedonia, Ethnography and Statistics"), 500 Greek Christians and 360 Turks lived in the village in 1900.

See also
Toumba
List of settlements in the Thessaloniki regional unit

References

Assiros Project web pages
Thracians and Mycenaeans: Proceedings of the Fourth International Congress 
The Oxford Illustrated History of Prehistoric Europe by Barry W. Cunliffe 
Urbanism in the Aegean Bronze Age by Keith Branigan 
Official site of the Demos (Municipality) of Assiros
Catalogue of archaeological sites in the Demos of Assiros

Populated places in Thessaloniki (regional unit)
Mycenaean sites in Macedonia (Greece)
Geography of ancient Mygdonia
Iron Age sites in Greece